The Transpacific Yacht Club (TPYC) is responsible for organizing the world-renowned Transpacific Yacht Race ("the Transpac") from Los Angeles to Honolulu.

Transpac
The Transpac is held in odd numbered years. The Transpac Race was originally the vision of Hawaii’s King Kalākaua as a way to build the islands' ties with the mainland U.S. Since its humble beginning in 1906, the Transpac has become the oldest and longest enduring ocean race in the world and a “must do” on many sailors' list of races.

Tahiti Race
Over the years TPYC has also been responsible for organizing the Los Angeles to Tahiti Race.  The Tahiti Race was most recently held in April and May, 2022.

Club information
TPYC was officially organized in 1928, and incorporated in 1937.  Membership in the Club is open to all sailors who have completed a race held by the Club. Over 600 sailors from around the globe are currently Transpac members. The TPYC and its members look forward to hosting "the world's best ocean race" for another century.

The Transpacific Yacht Club and the Newport Harbor Nautical Museum in Newport Beach, California, have recently reached an important decision that will significantly change the course of each institution. The Museum is now the official home of Transpac and the custodian of its history and memorabilia.

The Newport Harbor Nautical Museum is dedicated to preserving and promoting the nautical heritage of Newport Harbor, Balboa, southern California and the eastern Pacific through stimulating exhibitions, and inspiring education programs pertaining to nautical arts, artifacts, events and customs.

References

External links
 www.transpacrace.com 2009 Transpac Race
 www.transpacificyc.org Transpac race archives

Yacht clubs in the United States
1928 establishments in the United States